This is a list of Cal State Fullerton Titans softball seasons. The Cal State Fullerton Titans softball program is a college softball team that represents the California State University, Fullerton in the Big West Conference of the National Collegiate Athletic Association.

The Titans have won 17 conference championships and appeared in the NCAA Division I softball tournament 29 times, advancing to the Women's College World Series six times and winning the 1986 National Championship.  The Titans also appeared in two Women's College World Series while the AIAW sponsored the event.

Season results

Notes

References

Cal State Fullerton Titans softball seasons
Cal State Fullerton
Cal State Fullerton Titans softball seasons